Árborg Football Club  (Icelandic: Knattspyrnufélagið Árborg), is an Icelandic football club in the municipality of Árborg, which contains two villages, Stokkseyri and Eyrarbakki, one country side called Sandvíkurhreppur, and a town called Selfoss. The club's ground is in Selfoss where most of the players come from. Árborg FC currently plays in 4. deild karla (5th level in pyramid).
They have been active members of KSÍ since 2001 before that the club was called Lesbískir Mávar(lesbian Seagulls) and played in the Sunnlenska Utandeild(Non division football south).
Guðmundur Garðar Sigfússon is Árborg FC's most capped player with over 200 official games.

Club career

References

External links
http://www.arborgfc.net
http://www.xd.is
http://www.mbl.is

Football clubs in Iceland
Association football clubs established in 2000
2000 establishments in Iceland